Chhindwada is a city in Madhya Pradesh, India.It is also known as Corn city which is located in between the hills of satpuda range.

Demographics 

According to the 2011 census of India, Chhindwada has 388 households. The effective literacy rate (i.e. the literacy rate of population excluding children aged 6 and below) is 65.32%.

References 

Villages in Huzur tehsil